Stephen Douglas Brady (born November 23, 1969) is a retired Major League Baseball second baseman. He played during one season at the major league level for the Chicago White Sox, and one season in the Korea Baseball Organization for the Lotte Giants.

He was drafted by the White Sox in the 12th round of the 1991 amateur draft. In , he played for Lotte in the KBO.

References

External links

1969 births
Living people
Major League Baseball second basemen
Chicago White Sox players
Lotte Giants players
American expatriate baseball players in South Korea
KBO League infielders
Baseball players from Illinois
Utica Blue Sox players
South Bend White Sox players
Sarasota White Sox players
Gulf Coast White Sox players
Nashville Sounds players
Birmingham Barons players
Atlantic City Surf players
Liberty Flames baseball players
Sportspeople from Jacksonville, Illinois